The Hayward Area Recreation and Park District (H.A.R.D.) is the park management agency for most of the parks in the city of Hayward, California. It was created in 1944 and is an independent special district under California law. H.A.R.D. is the largest recreation district in California. It also manages parks in the bordering unincorporated communities of Castro Valley, San Lorenzo, Fairview, Ashland and Cherryland. It manages the park grounds for numerous schools in the region. Events and classes are scheduled and listed in a quarterly brochure. The parks' 2021 budget is $24,306,495.

List of parks
This is a list of parks managed by H.A.R.D., by city or unincorporated community, with indications of significant park features beyond picnic and open areas, parking, ball courts, restrooms, etc.

Hayward
73 parks are operated in Hayward:

Alden E. Oliver Sports Park of Hayward
Bechtel Mini Park
Bidwell Park
Birchfield Park
Brenkwitz High School
Matt Jimenez Community Center
youth center, gymnasium
Bret Harte School
Burbank School
recreation center
Cannery Park
Canyon View Park
Centennial Park
Cherryland Park
Children's Park at Alex Giualini Plaza
Christian Penke Park
College Heights Park
Colonial Acres School
Douglas Morrisson Theatre
theatrical venue
East Avenue Park
amphitheatre
East Avenue School
Eden Greenway
El Rancho Verde School
Eldridge Park
Fairmont Linear Park
Fairview Park
recreation center
Fairway Greens Park
Gansberger Park
Gordon E. Oliver Eden Shores Park
Greenbelt Trails (see Memorial Park)
hiking/riding trails
Greenwood Park
Harder School
Haymont Mini Park
Hayward Area Senior Center
community center
Hayward High School
swim center
Hayward Shoreline Interpretive Center
Jalquin Vista Park
Japanese Gardens
wedding site
Kennedy Park
group picnic area, petting zoo, children's train, merry-go-round
La Placita Mini Park
Lakeridge Park
Longwood Park
Martin Luther King Field
Memorial Park
group picnic area, hiking/riding trails (access point for Greenbelt Trails), swim center/indoor pool (Hayward Plunge)
Mt. Eden High School
Mt. Eden Park
group picnic area, softball field, Mt. Eden Mansion
Nuestro Parquecito
Old Highlands Park
hiking/riding trails
Palma Ceia Park
recreation center building
Park School
Pexioto School
PhotoCentral
darkrooms, gallery
Rancho Arroyo Park
Ruus Park
Schafer Park
Shepherd School
Silver Star Veterans Park
hiking/riding trails
group picnic area, hiking/riding trails, pro shop, restaurant, driving range
Sorensdale Park
disabled citizen center
Southgate Park
group picnic area, hiking/riding trails, community center building
Spring Grove Park
Stonybrook Park
Stratford Village Park
skate area
Sunset Adult School
swim center
Tennyson High School
Tennyson Park
group picnic area, skate area
Twin Bridges Park
Tyrrell School
Valle Vista Park
Weekes Park
group picnic area, community center building, art studio
Weekes Community Center

Ashland
Three parks are operated in Ashland:
Ashland Park and Community Center
community center building
Jack Holland Sr. Park
skate park 
Edendale Park
dog park

Castro Valley
Twenty parks are operated in Castro Valley:

Adobe Center
Bay Trees Park
Canyon Middle School
Carlos Bee Park
Castro Valley High School
swim center
Castro Valley Park and Community Center
community center, Chanticleer's Little Theatre
Deerview Park
Earl Warren Park
Greenridge Park
Independent School
Kenneth C. Aitken Senior and Community Center
community center, senior center
Laurel Park
Marshall School
Palomares Hills Park
Parsons Park
Proctor School
Redwood School
Rowell Ranch
rodeo park. The park is a current, and historic site, for rodeos, and was frequented by Western film stars in the past.
Strobridge School
Vannoy School

Cherryland
Four parks are operated in Cherryland:

Cherryland Park
Playground and picnic grounds
Old Creek Dog Park of Cherryland
Meek Estate Park
Historic Building, cherry orchard
Cherryland Community Center

Fairview
Four parks are operated in Fairview:

San Felipe Park
community building
Sulphur Creek Nature Center
nature center, including animal rehabilitation facilities
Lakeridge Park
East Avenue Park

San Lorenzo
Ten parks are operated in San Lorenzo:

Arroyo High School
Bohannon School
Del Rey Park
Fairmont Terrace Park
Hesperian Park
McConaghy Park
historical building (McConaghy House, with museum managed by the Hayward Area Historical Society)
Mervin Morris Park
skate area
San Lorenzo High School
San Lorenzo Park and Recreation Center
hiking/riding trails, community center building, lagoon

Other sites
H.A.R.D. has partnered with the Hayward Area Historical Society to restore the Meek Mansion, and to manage the open space portions of the site. The Hayward Area Shoreline Planning Agency, created in 1970, is a joint project of H.A.R.D., the East Bay Regional Parks District and the city of Hayward to protect shoreline resources from San Lorenzo Creek to New Alameda Creek on the border of Hayward and Fremont.

Hayward parks not managed by HARD
Julio Bras Portuguese Centennial Park and Newman Park in downtown Hayward are not managed by HARD.

References

External links

Hayward Area Recreation and Park District website
H.A.R.D. 5 year strategic plan for 2009-2013

Parks in Hayward, California
Park districts in California
Government of Alameda County, California
1944 establishments in California